A partial lunar eclipse took place on Thursday 5 July 2001, the second of three lunar eclipses in 2001.

Visibility

Related lunar eclipses

Eclipses of 2001 
 A total lunar eclipse on January 9.
 A total solar eclipse on June 21.
 A partial lunar eclipse on July 5.
 An annular solar eclipse on December 14.
 A penumbral lunar eclipse on December 30.

Lunar year series

Half-Saros cycle
A lunar eclipse will be preceded and followed by solar eclipses by 9 years and 5.5 days (a half saros). This lunar eclipse is related to two total solar eclipses of Solar Saros 146.

Saros cycle

See also 
List of lunar eclipses
List of 21st-century lunar eclipses

References

External links 
 Saros cycle 139
 

2001-07
2001 in science
July 2001 events